Beechwood High School is a 6-year 7-12th grade high school, located in Fort Mitchell, Kentucky, United States.

General information 
Beechwood High School, founded 1860, is operated by an "independent" school district, which in Kentucky refers to a district that is independent of a county. Most school districts in the state coincide exactly with county boundaries. The Beechwood district is run by the superintendent, Dr. Mike Stacy. Beechwood High School is consistently one of the highest-rated schools in Kentucky. This school is a relatively small with roughly 115 students in each graduating class. The school's mascot is the Tiger. Although the high school is listed as 7th-12th grade, an elementary (grades K-6) also exists in a connected building. These two schools make up the Beechwood Independent School District.

Awards and recognition
They have been ranked one of the best high schools in the nation by U.S. News & World Report in 2008.

Athletics
In 2008 the school had the following teams: Football, Boys' and Girls' track, Boys' and Girls' Cross Country, Archery, Boys' and Girls Basketball, Baseball, Fastpitch Softball, Girls' and Boys' swimming, Boys' and Girls' Golf, Boys' and Girls' Tennis, Volleyballs, and Girls' Soccer.

State champions
17-Time Kentucky High School Athletic Association state champions in football - 14 championships in class 1A and three championships in 2A)
(1984, 1991, 1992, 1993, 1994, 1996, 1997, 1999, 2004, 2007, 2008, 2016, 2017, 2018, 2020-2A, 2021-2A, 2022-2A)

Football
Beechwood built a dominant football program in the 1990s under head coach Mike Yeagle. Accumulating 7 state titles, 3 undefeated seasons, and a Northern Kentucky record 38 consecutive wins all within the decade, the Tigers were the most successful team in the state from 1990 to 1999 in both wins (126) and winning percentage (.893). Beechwood carried their winning tradition into the new millennium by winning back-to-back state titles in 2007 and 2008 under new head coach Noel Rash, soon after forming an active streak of three consecutive state championships from 2016 to 2018 and the first 2A state championship in school history in 2020. 

2022 State Champion (14-1)
2021 State Champion (15–0)
2020 State Champion (10–2)
2018 State Champion (13–2)
2017 State Champion (13–2)
2016 State Champion (14-1)
2008 State Champion (14-1)
2007 State Champion (13-2)
2004 State Champion (14-1)
1999 State Champion (13-2)
1997 State Champion (14-0)
1996 State Champion (12-2)
1994 State Champion (15-0)
1993 State Champion (11-3)
1992 State Champion (13-1)
1991 State Champion (15-0)
1984 State Champion (13-0)

Band program
The Beechwood band program is the largest activity on the Beechwood Schools campus encompassing nearly 250 students from 5th to 12th grade. The band program includes the national award-winning Marching Tigers, high school symphonic band, high school percussion ensemble, jazz ensemble, jazz lab band, middle school bands, pep bands, chamber ensembles, and winter guards. The band program is under the direction of Austin Bralley.

Winter Guard 
The Beechwood High School Varsity Winter Guard is one of the most successful guard programs in Kentucky. The Beechwood Varsity Winter Guard competes in Tri-State Marching Arts as well as Winter Guard International. Recently, the Varsity Winter Guard was the TMA Regional A Gold Medalists in 2017 and 2018.

Marching Tigers 
The Marching Tigers have been awarded the Bands of America Class A National Championship two times (2006,2011). Beechwood is the only band program in KMEA history to win a state championship under four different band directors. In 2019, the Marching Tigers represented the Commonwealth of Kentucky in the National Memorial Day Parade in Washington DC. The Marching Tigers were awarded the John Philip Sousa Foundation Sudler Shield in 2022.

KMEA State Champions

Class 1A – 1990, 2006, 2010, 2011, 2012, 2013, 2015, 2016

Class 2A – 2019, 2021

KMEA State Finalist

Class 1A - 1986, 1990, 2005, 2006, 2007, 2008, 2009, 2010, 2011, 2012, 2013, 2014, 2015, 2016, 2017, 2018

Class 2A - 1987, 1988, 1991, 1992, 2019, 2021

Class 3A - 1996, 2022

Bands of America National Champions

Class 1A - 2006, 2011

Bands of America National Semifinalists

2006, 2008, 2011, 2013, 2015, 2017, 2019, 2022

Notable alumni 
 Brandon Berger, former Kansas City Royals outfielder

References

External links
Beechwood High School home page
Beechwood Independent School District
https://khsaa.org/records/football/fb90syearbyyear.pdf

Schools in Kenton County, Kentucky
Public high schools in Kentucky
1860 establishments in Kentucky